Chapple may refer to:

People

Surname
 Alex Chapple, Canadian director and actor
 Belinda Chapple, Australian singer
 Brian Chapple, English composer
 David Chapple, American football player and artist
 Derek Barton-Chapple, English actor
 Eliot Chapple, American anthropologist
 Ewart Chapple (1901–1995), Australian pianist, broadcasting executive
 Frank Chapple, English unionist
 Frederic Chapple (1845–1924), headmaster of Prince Alfred College
 Frederick Chapple, English footballer
 Geoff Chapple, English football manager
 Geoff Chapple, New Zealand author and journalist
 Glen Chapple, English cricketer
 James Chapple, New Zealand pacifist
 Jane Chapple-Hyam, English racehorse trainer
 Jem Chapple, British jockey
 John Chapple (disambiguation)
 Lee Chapple, American football quarterback
 Les Chapple, Australian rules footballer
 Murray Chapple, New Zealand cricketer
 Peter Chapple-Hyam, English racehorse trainer
 Phil Chapple, English footballer
 Phoebe Chapple MM (1879-1967), South Australian medico
 Robin Chapple, Australian politician
 Thomas William Chapple, Canadian politician
 William Chapple (disambiguation)

Given name

 Chapple Norton, British army colonel and politician

Places

 Chapple Cornes, Michigan, United States
 Chapple, Ontario, Canada

See also
 Alex Chappell
 Chapples Park, Thunder Bay, Ontario, Canada